The Individualism of Gil Evans is an album by pianist, conductor, arranger and composer Gil Evans originally released on the Verve label in 1964. It features Evans' big band arrangements of five original compositions (two cowritten with Miles Davis) and compositions by Kurt Weill, Bob Dorough, John Lewis and Willie Dixon. Tracks 1, 6, 7, 8 and 9 first appeared on the CD version of the album.

Reception
The Allmusic review by Scott Yanow awarded the album 4 stars stating "Highly recommended to Gil Evans fans; it is a pity he did not record more during this era". Gil Evans was nominated for a Grammy Award for the album, for Best Instrumental Jazz Performance – Large Group or Soloist With Large Group (losing to Laurindo Almeida, for Guitar from Ipanema).

Track listing
 "Time of the Barracudas" (Miles Davis, Gil Evans) – 7:26  
 "The Barbara Song" (Bertolt Brecht, Kurt Weill) – 9:59  
 "Las Vegas Tango" – 6:35  
 "Flute Song/Hotel Me (Miles Davis, Gil Evans) – 12:29     
 "El Toreador" – 3:26  
 "Proclamation" – 3:55  
 "Nothing Like You" (Bob Dorough, Fran Landesman) – 2:36  
 "Concorde" (John Lewis) – 7:39  
 "Spoonful" (Willie Dixon) – 13:46

All songs written by Gil Evans, except as indicated.
Recorded at A&R Studios, New York in September, 1963; at Webster Hall, New York on April 6 and May 25, 1964; and at Van Gelder's Studio, Englewood Cliffs, New Jersey on July 9 and October 29, 1964.
The original LP release consisted of tracks 2–5.

Collective personnel 

Gil Evans – piano, arranger 
Johnny Coles – trumpet (Solo) 
Thad Jones – trumpet 
Ernie Royal – trumpet  
Bernie Glow – trumpet 
Louis Mucci – trumpet 
Jimmy Knepper – trombone 
Frank Rehak – trombone 
Jimmy Cleveland – trombone (Solo)
Tony Studd – trombone
Bill Barber – tuba 
Wayne Shorter – tenor sax (Solo) 
Phil Woods – alto sax (Solo) 
Eric Dolphy – woodwinds (flute, bass clarinet, alto sax)
Steve Lacy – soprano sax  
Jerome Richardson – reeds, woodwinds 
Bob Tricarico – reeds, woodwinds 
Al Block – woodwinds (flute solo) 
Garvin Bushell – reeds, woodwinds 
Andy Fitzgerald – reeds, woodwinds 
George Marge – reeds, woodwinds 
Julius Watkins – French horn 
Gil Cohen – French horn 
Don Corado – French horn
Bob Northern – French horn 
Jimmy Buffington – French horn 
Ray Alonge – French horn 
Pete Levin – French Horn
Harry Lookofsky – tenor violin 
Bob Maxwell – harp
Margaret Ross – harp 
Kenny Burrell – guitar 
Barry Galbraith – guitar 
Gary Peacock – bass 
Ron Carter – bass 
Paul Chambers – bass 
Richard Davis – bass 
Ben Tucker – bass 
Milt Hinton – bass 
Elvin Jones – drums 
Osie Johnson – drums

References 

1964 albums
Gil Evans albums
Verve Records albums
Albums produced by Creed Taylor
Albums arranged by Gil Evans
Albums conducted by Gil Evans